Troy Sienkiewicz (born May 27, 1972) is a former American football guard and tackle. He played for the San Diego Chargers from 1996 to 1998.

References

1972 births
Living people
American football offensive guards
American football offensive tackles
New Mexico State Aggies football players
San Diego Chargers players